Nohochichak is an extinct genus of megalonychid ground sloth from the Late Pleistocene (Rancholabrean) of the Yucatan Peninsula in Mexico.

Discovery and taxonomy 
The only known specimens were discovered in the underwater cave system of Hoyo Negro in Quintana Roo, consisting of a partial skull and mandible. It was found to be closer to other Mexican Sloth taxa, like Xibalbaonyx, Meizonyx and Zacatzontli than North American taxa like Megalonyx.

References 

Prehistoric sloths
Prehistoric placental genera
Pleistocene xenarthrans
Pleistocene mammals of North America
Rancholabrean
Pleistocene Mexico
Fossils of Mexico
Fossil taxa described in 2017